Burtanimakhi (Dargwa: Буртанимахьи) is a rural locality (a selo) in Arshimakhinsky Selsoviet, Levashinsky District, Republic of Dagestan, Russia. The population was 301 as of 2010. There are 3 streets.

Geography 
Burtanimakhi is located 29 km southwest of Levashi (the district's administrative centre) by road. Karekadani and Tarlimakhi are the nearest rural localities.

Nationalities 
Dargins live there.

References 

Rural localities in Levashinsky District